Kipfer is a surname. Notable people with the surname include:

Barbara Ann Kipfer (born 1954), American lexicographer, linguist, ontologist and part-time archaeologist
Christian Kipfer (1921–2009), Swiss gymnast
Ernst Kipfer (1915–2016), Swiss footballer

See also
Kiefer